This list contains the UIC classification of goods wagons and their meanings. The description is made up of a category letter (in capitals) and usually several index letters (in lower case).

The international system for the classification of goods wagons was agreed by the Union internationale des chemins de fer (UIC) in 1965 and subsequently introduced into member countries. For example it was adopted in Germany on 1 January 1968 replacing the previous German railway wagon classes that originated as early as 1905. The UIC classification has been amended several times since it began.

Not all wagons are given UIC designations. In Germany the few remaining guards vans and narrow gauge goods wagons have retained their original classifications.

Category letters 

The following table contains the complete list of standard category letters. Letters A, B, C, D, P and W are reserved for coaches. However, also S is used for coaches and this doubles a goods wagons class. These are covered in detail in the article on UIC classification of railway coaches.
Each goods wagons type is given a type number, whose first digit forms the fifth digit of the 12-digit UIC wagon number.

Index letters

International index letters

National index letters

Country code 50: DR

Country code 80: DB 
(Germany)

Country code 85: SBB 
(Switzerland)

See also 
 Austauschbauart
 Union Internationale des Chemins de Fer (UIC)
 UIC identification marking for tractive stock
 UIC classification of locomotive axle arrangements
 UIC classification of railway coaches
 UIC country codes
 Numbering scheme

Footnotes and references

External links 
 Marking of freight wagons (UIC site)
 Overview of former and current classification systems 
 Current classifications used by  Railion. 
 UIC classification system 

Rolling stock classification systems
Classification of goods wagons
Rail transport standards
Railway vehicles register numbers